Golden crab may refer to:

 The Golden Crab, a Greek fairy tale
 Golden crab (animal), Chaceon fenneri, a species of crab

See also

 
 Golden (disambiguation)
 Crab (disambiguation)
 Golden king crab
 Golden ghost crab